City of Churches is a name given to various cities with many churches.

This phrase has been used to describe the following cities:

In Europe
 Rome, Italy
 Bristol, England
 Geneva, Switzerland
 Kraków, Poland
 Moscow, Russia
 Norwich, England
 Przemyśl, Poland
 Naples, Italy
 Vilnius, Lithuania
 Ohrid, North Macedonia

In America

In the United States
 Detroit, Michigan
 Brooklyn, New York 
 Charlotte, North Carolina
 Danville, Virginia
 Bloomfield, New Jersey
 Easton, Pennsylvania
 Fort Wayne, Indiana
 Holland, Michigan
 Indianapolis, Indiana
 Jonesboro, Arkansas
 Louisville, Kentucky
 Manchester, New Hampshire
 Memphis, Tennessee
 Richmond, Virginia
 Titusville, Florida
 Wheaton, Illinois
 Tulsa, Oklahoma
 Berkeley, California

Elsewhere
 Toronto, Ontario
 Montreal, Quebec
 Santiago de Querétaro, Querétaro, Mexico
 Ayacucho, Peru

In Oceania
 Adelaide, South Australia
 Christchurch, New Zealand

See also
City of Spires
Oxford, England - known as the "City of dreaming spires"

References

Lists of cities